Kartaly (Kärtäle) is a rural locality (a village) in Ishlinsky Selsoviet, Beloretsky District, Bashkortostan, Russia. The population was 34 as of 2010. There are 2 streets.

Geography 
Kartaly is located 44 km west of Beloretsk (the district's administrative centre) by road. Tikhy Klyuch is the nearest rural locality.

References 

Rural localities in Beloretsky District